Ticlla (possibly from Quechua for eyelash; two-colored or for 'with alternating colors') is a   mountain in the Chila mountain range in the Andes of Peru. It is located in the Arequipa Region, Caylloma Province, on the border of the districts of Caylloma and Tuti. Ticlla lies southwest of Jatunchungara and Chungara.

References

Mountains of Peru
Mountains of Arequipa Region